Punta Izopo National Park is a national park located in the municipality of Tela, on the northern Caribbean coast of the Atlántida department of Honduras. It has an altitude of 118 metres.

References

External links
Punta Izopo National Park

National parks of Honduras
Protected areas established in 1992
Ramsar sites in Honduras
Central American Atlantic moist forests